Javadiyeh ol Hiyeh (also Romanized as Javādīyeh ol Hīyeh; also known as Javādīyeh and Javādīyeh-ye Fallāḩ) is a village in Bahreman Rural District, Nuq District, Rafsanjan County, Kerman Province, Iran. At the 2006 census, its population was 2,836, in 677 families.

References 

Populated places in Rafsanjan County